DigitalOcean Holdings, Inc. is an American multinational technology company and cloud service provider. The company is headquartered in New York City, New York, USA, with 15 globally distributed data centers worldwide. DigitalOcean provides developers, startups and SMBs with cloud infrastructure-as-a-service platforms. 

DigitalOcean also runs Hacktoberfest, a one-month-long celebration of open source software held in October. Each year it partners with different software companies, including GitHub, Twilio, Dev.to, Intel, AppWrite and DeepSource.

History
In 2003, Ben Uretsky and Moisey Uretsky, who founded the ServerStack, a managed hosting business, wanted to create a new product that would combine web hosting and virtual servers and target entrepreneurial with software developers. 

In 2012, the Uretskys met co-founder Mitch Wainer following Wainer's response to a Craigslist job listing. Mitch Wainer company launched their beta product in January 2012. In mid-2012, the founding team consisted of Ben Uretsky, Moisey Uretsky, Mitch Wainer, Jeff Carr, and Alec Hartman. DigitalOcean accepted the offer of TechStars 2012's startup accelerator in Boulder, Colorado, and the founders moved to Boulder to work on the product. At the end of the accelerator program in August 2012, the company had signed up 400 customers and launched around 10,000 cloud server instances. On January 16, 2018, new droplet (virtual machines) plans were introduced. In May 2018, the company announced the launch of its Kubernetes-based container service.

In June 2018, Mark Templeton, former CEO of Citrix, replaced co-founder Ben Uretsky as the company's CEO. In July 2019, Yancey Spruill, former CFO and COO of SendGrid (a fellow Techstars company), replaced Templeton as CEO. Bill Sorenson, former CFO of EnerNOC, was appointed as the company's new CFO. 

In September 2021, DigitalOcean announced plans to acquire Nimbella, a serverless startup. In March 2022, the company acquired CSS-Tricks, a learning website for front-end developers.  

In May 2022, the company released DigitalOcean Functions. Based on technology acquired from Nimbella and the open source Apache OpenWhisk project, DigitalOcean Functions is a serverless platform that allows developers to build and run applications without having to manage servers. 

In August 2022, DigitalOcean acquired Cloudways, a Pakistani cloud hosting service provider, for $350 million in an all-cash deal.

Growth
On January 15, 2013, DigitalOcean became one of the first cloud-hosting companies to offer SSD-based virtual machines. Following a TechCrunch review, which was syndicated by Hacker News, DigitalOcean saw a rapid increase in customers. In December 2013, DigitalOcean opened its first European data center, located in Amsterdam. During 2014, the company continued its expansion, opening new data centers in Singapore and London. During 2015 DigitalOcean expanded further with a data center in Toronto, Canada. and Frankfurt, Germany. Later in 2016, they continued expansion to Bangalore, India.

Funding
The company's seed funding was led by IA Ventures and raised US$3.2 million in July 2013. Its series A round of funding in March 2014, led by venture capitalist firm Andreessen Horowitz, raised US$37.2 million. In December 2014, DigitalOcean raised US$50 million in debt financing from Fortress Investment Group in the form of a five-year term loan. In July 2015, the company raised US$83 million in its series B round of funding led by Access Industries with participation from Andreessen Horowitz. In April 2016, the company secured US$130 million in credit financing to build out new cloud services. In May 2020, Digital Ocean raised an additional $50 million from Access Industries and Andreessen Horowitz.

On March 24, 2021, DigitalOcean became a publicly traded company on the New York Stock Exchange, with their initial public offering price at $47 per share.

Blocking in Iran and Russia

DigitalOcean had been blocked in Iran as a result of an attempt to cut off the use of the Lantern internet censorship circumvention tool.

Under Russian law, any host keeping citizens' personal data needs to be located in Russian territory. That led to a temporary block in April 2018 of Google, Amazon, Azure, and DigitalOcean, among others, in Russia by Roskomnadzor as a hosting provider for Telegram Messenger and VPS services.

Corporate affairs

Products and business model 

DigitalOcean offers virtual private servers (VPS), or "droplets" using DigitalOcean terminology, using KVM as the hypervisor and can be created in various sizes (divided in 2 classes: standard, and optimized), in 13 different data center regions (as of December 2020) and with various options out of the box, including six Linux distributions and dozens of one-click applications. 

In early 2017, DigitalOcean expanded their feature set by adding load balancers to their offering. Their platform is an alternative cloud offering and the company targets smaller developers, allowing them to spend as little as five dollars on their platform.

DigitalOcean can be managed through a web interface or using  command line.

DigitalOcean also offers block and object-based storage and since May 2018 Kubernetes-based container service.

Reviewers have noted that DigitalOcean requires users to have some experience in sysadmin and DevOps. In his review for ScienceBlogs, writer Greg Laden warned: "DigitalOcean is not for everybody. You need to be at least a little savvy with Linux ... "

In 2021, DigitalOcean launched a managed MongoDB database service.

DigitalOcean community
As of 2021, DigitalOcean is hosting publicly available community forums and tutorials on open source and system administration topics. As of August 2014 the service claimed to have over 1,000 vetted tutorials.

In 2017, in partnership with Stripe, DigitalOcean sponsored the Libscore tool to freely provide the developer community with open access to analytics on web development tools.

DigitalOcean Marketplace provides facilities to quickly deploy popular software bundles. Internally it's run by DigitalOcean Kubernetes, OpenChannel for the catalog API and data warehouse and Cloudflare for CDN and load-balancing.

Hacktoberfest 2020 controversy 
DigitalOcean was widely criticized for its role in creating a perverse incentive when it promoted Hacktoberfest 2020 with free t-shirts for contributions to open source projects, resulting in massive spurious pull requests on open source GitHub repositories, amounting to an unintentional "corporate-sponsored distributed denial of service attack against the open source maintainer community". DigitalOcean was quick to respond, and issued updates to Hacktoberfest to help prevent this, by allowing open source maintainers to specifically opt into Hacktoberfest, updating the Hacktoberfest process to allow maintainers to mark spammy content, and preventing repositories set up just to game the system from participating.

References

External links
 
 Hacktoberfest

Cloud computing providers
Cloud platforms
Cloud storage
File hosting
Internet technology companies of the United States
Network file systems
Web hosting
Web services
Technology companies based in New York City
American companies established in 2011
2011 establishments in New York City
Computer companies established in 2011
2021 initial public offerings
Companies listed on the New York Stock Exchange
Publicly traded companies based in New York City